Here is a list of cities and towns in São Tomé and Príncipe. These are villages, towns, and cities with populations over 300. The date of censuses are August 4, 1991, August 25, 2001, and January 1, 2005:

Others
 Bom Successo
 Ribeira Afonso
 São João dos Angolares

External links
Instituto Nacional de Estatística
Mongabay - Actual populations of towns and cities of São Tomé and Príncipe
City Population  - Population History of the towns and cities in São Tomé und Príncipe

 
Sao Tome and Principe
Sao Tome and Principe
Cities